Fredrik Lovén (born 26 May 1976) is a former professional tennis player from Sweden.

Biography
Lovén made his only ATP Tour main draw appearance at the 2000 Stockholm Open, partnering Robert Lindstedt in the doubles. The pair, who had made it through qualifying, reached the quarter-finals with a win over Czech fourth seeds David Rikl and Cyril Suk.

Most of his singles matches were played on the Futures circuit. As a doubles player he won three Challenger titles.
 
Now based in Oslo, Lovén is the Sports Director at Heming Tennis and a former coach of WTA Tour players. He has previously coached Eleni Daniilidou, Sofia Arvidsson and Kaia Kanepi.

ATP Challenger and ITF Futures finals

Singles: 4 (2–2)

Doubles: 25 (17–8)

References

External links
 
 

1976 births
Living people
Swedish male tennis players
Swedish tennis coaches